The 1989 All-Big Eight Conference football team consists of American football players chosen by various organizations for All-Big Eight Conference teams for the 1989 NCAA Division I-A football season.  The selectors for the 1989 season included the Associated Press (AP).

Offensive selections

Quarterbacks
 Darian Hagan, Colorado (AP-1)

Running backs
 Blaise Bryant, Iowa State (AP-1)
 Ken Clark, Nebraska (AP-1)
 Mike Gaddis, Oklahoma

Tight ends
 Mike Busch, Iowa State (AP-1)

Wide receivers
 Michael Smith, Kansas State (AP-1)
 Quinton Smith, Kansas (AP-1)

Centers
 Jake Young, Nebraska (AP-1)

Offensive linemen
 Doug Glaser, Nebraska (AP-1)
 Mark Vander Poel, Colorado (AP-1)
 Darren Mullenburg, Colorado (AP-1)
 Joe Garten, Colorado (AP-1)

Defensive selections

Defensive ends
 Alfred Williams, Colorado (AP-1)
 Kanavis McGhee, Colorado (AP-1)

Defensive lineman
 Arthur Walker, Colorado (AP-1)
 Scott Evans, Oklahoma (AP-1)
 Kent Wells, Nebraska (AP-1)

Linebackers
 Jeff Mills, Nebraska (AP-1)
 Sim Drain, Oklahoma State (AP-1)

Defensive backs
 Adrian Jones, Missouri (AP-1)
 Reggie Cooper, Nebraska (AP-1)
 Marcus Robertson, Iowa State (AP-1)
 Bruce Pickens, Nebraska (AP-1)

Special teams

Place-kicker
 Cary Blanchard, Oklahoma State (AP-1)

Punter
 Tom Rouen, Colorado (AP-1)

Key

AP = Associated Press

See also
 1989 College Football All-America Team

References

All-Big Seven Conference football team
All-Big Eight Conference football teams